Marguerite-Philippe du Cambout (1624 – 9 December 1674) was a French noblewoman.

Life

Marguerite du Cambout was born in 1624.
Her parents were Charles du Cambout, Marquis of Coislin and Philippe de Beurges, dame de Seury.
Her father was Marquis of Coislin, Pontchâteau and la Roche-Bernard, governor of the town and fortresses of Brest and lieutenant general of lower Brittany.
He was from the old nobility of Brittany.
Her mother was Philippe de Beurges, dame de Seuri et de la Moguelaye.
She was the niece of Cardinal Richelieu.

In 1634 she was married to Antoine de l'Age (1605–35), Duke of Aiguilon, also called Duke of Pui-Laurent.
In February 1639 she married Henri de Lorraine  (1601–66), Count of Harcourt, Grand Écuyer de France.4.
They had six children.
Marguerite du Cambout died of apoplexy in Paris on 9 December 1674 at the age of 50.
She was buried in the Eglise des Capucines on the Rue Saint-Honoré, Paris.
Her half length portrait by Balthazar Moncornet (1598-1668), dated 1658, is held by the British Museum.
In an oval border, it shows her upper body in an elaborate dress adorned with pearls and jewels, with a hunting scene in the background.
There are four lines of verse below the portrait,

Children

Her children with Henri, Count of Harcourt were:
 Armande Henriette de Lorraine-Guise (1640–1684), abbess of Soissons
 Louis, Count of Armagnac (1641–1718), called Monsieur le Grand, Grand Écuyer de France, Count of Charny and of Brionne
 Philippe, Chevalier de Lorraine (1643–1702), Abbé of Saint Pierre in Chartres
 Alfonse Louis (1644–1689), Abbé of Royaumont, called chevalier d'Harcourt
 Raimond Bérenger (1647–1686), Abbé of Faron de Meaux
 Charles, Count of Marsan (1648–1708)

Notes

Sources

1624 births
1674 deaths
French countesses
French duchesses
French princesses